The Jepettos are an alternative folk band from Belfast and Derry, Northern Ireland. The band was formed in February 2011 and consists of writer members Michael Aicken (vocals, guitars) and Ruth Aicken (vocals, various instruments) alongside an alternating line-up of musicians. Highlights in the band's career have included supporting rapper Tinie Tempah and sharing the bill with Foo Fighters and The Black Keys at Tennent's Vital in 2012.

History
After performing together with Northern Ireland folk act The Lowly Knights, Michael and Ruth Aicken initially formed The Jepettos with Derry trio Emma Flanagan (clarinet, glockenspiel), Colm Hinds (bass) and Daniel Kerr (drums, glockenspiel). Since formation the group has also variously contained additional musicians Michael Andrews (bass), Scott Jamison (drums, glockenspiel), Jonny Ashe (electric guitar), Laura-Jane Hughes (trumpet) and Sarah Williamson (oboe). The band is named after Geppetto, the father of fictional character Pinocchio.

The group released their debut EP Start a New People in January 2012. Single "Goldrush" was released initially as a free download, and featured Duke Special on piano. The single garnered positive reviews from Hot Press magazine and the Daily Mirror, and a music video, directed by Marty Stalker, was produced to accompany the release.

The Jepettos made a number of showcase performances during the summer and autumn of 2012. They performed in July at Glasgowbury Festival, and then in August the band was selected to play the new second stage at the annual Tennent's Vital festival, sharing the bill with The Black Keys and Foo Fighters. At Arthur's Day 2012 the group supported English rapper Tinie Tempah live in Belfast.

In 2013 The Jepettos released "Water", a single featuring cellist and singer Alana Henderson. Henderson has since joined the backing group for Irish singer-songwriter Hozier, performing across the world and on national US television. The song was chosen as BBC Radio 1 DJ Huw Stephens' "Introducing Discovery" in September 2013.

Discography

Extended plays

Singles

Music videos

References

External links
 The Jepettos on Bandcamp
 
 

Folk music groups from Northern Ireland
Musical groups from Belfast
Musical groups from Derry (city)
Musical groups established in 2011
2011 establishments in Northern Ireland